Cancellothyris is a genus of brachiopods belonging to the family Cancellothyrididae.

The species of this genus are found in Australia and Africa.

Species:

Cancellothyris africana 
Cancellothyris ascotensis 
Cancellothyris hedleyi 
Cancellothyris platys

References

Brachiopod genera